Dom Pedro Álvares Pereira (13?? – 14 August 1385) was a Portuguese noble of the 14th century. 

He was the son of Marinha Domingues and Álvaro Gonçalves Pereira, to whom he succeed after his death as patriarch of the Pereira family and as Prior of Crato (leader of the Knights Hospitaller in Portugal). He was the older brother of the Constable of Portugal, Dom Nuno Álvares Pereira.

He became an ally of Dona Leonor Teles, and during the Portuguese crisis of 1383–1385 he supported the claims to the Portuguese throne of John I of Castile, who would nominate him Master of the Castilian Order of Calatrava. 

Fighting for John I of Castile, he participated in the Battle of Atoleiros where he was defeated by his brother, Nuno Álvares Pereira, and was one of the few survivors from the Castilian army. In the Battle of Aljubarrota he led a Castilian charge against the Portuguese rearguard, but he died soon after while running away from his brother's army.

See also
History of Portugal
Kingdom of Portugal
House of Avis
House of Burgundy
Hundred Years War

Notes

References
Edward McMurdo: The History of Portugal (2); The History of Portugal from the Reign of D. Diniz to the reign of D. Afonso V (2009)
Jean Froissart, Sainte-Palaye (Jean-Baptiste de La Curne, M. de La Curne de): Chronicles of England, France, Spain, and the adjoining countries,: from the latter part of the reign of Edward II. to the coronation of Henry IV (1839)
Enrique Gallego Blanco: The Rule of the Spanish Military Order of St. James (1971)

1385 deaths
Portuguese nobility
Portuguese Roman Catholics
People of the 1383–1385 Portuguese interregnum
14th-century Portuguese people
Year of birth unknown
Portuguese military personnel killed in action